Dimitrios Polymerou (born May 17, 1974, in Drama) is a retired male javelin thrower from Greece, who represented his native country at the 1996 Summer Olympics in Atlanta, Georgia. He set his personal best (81.20 metres) on August 1, 1999, at a meet in Patras.

Achievements

References

sports-reference

1974 births
Living people
Sportspeople from Drama, Greece
Greek male javelin throwers
Athletes (track and field) at the 1996 Summer Olympics
Olympic athletes of Greece
Mediterranean Games silver medalists for Greece
Mediterranean Games medalists in athletics
Athletes (track and field) at the 1997 Mediterranean Games
Athletes (track and field) at the 2001 Mediterranean Games
Competitors at the 1995 Summer Universiade